Somos Región is a regionalist political party in the Region of Murcia, launched in February 2018 as a split from the ruling People's Party by former President of the Region of Murcia Alberto Garre.

References

Centrist parties in Spain
2018 establishments in Spain
Political parties established in 2018
Political parties in the Region of Murcia